Abena B. Brigidi (Mrs.) is a Ghanaian investment analyst author and speaker. She is a certified financial analyst and a thoroughly bred banker with over a decade in the financial Industry. Abena is married to legal practitioner David Cobbina Brigidi.

Early life
Brigidi is a product of the Achimota school and Aburi Girls Senior High School. She holds a bachelor's degree in Humanities from the University of Ghana and as well as Masters of Business Administration (MBA) in General Management from the University of East London.  She worships with the Restoration Center of the Assemblies of God Church Roman Ridge.

Career
Brigidi had a stint with Halifax PLC; a bank operating in the United Kingdom as a trading division of the Bank of Scotland. She joined Zenith Bank Ghana as a customer service advisor and then as a relationship manager and head of customer service in Ghana Branch. She left Zenith Bank and joined All-Time Capital, an investing banking firm in Accra as vice president for sales and marketing with responsibility over marketing and new product development. After two years with All-Time Capital she joined Kariela Oil and Gas Ghana between January 2010 and August 2014, where she spent four years in the position of chief financial officer.

Brigidi was a founding partner and the chief executive officer at Nimed Capital Limited, a leading investment banking firm.

References

Year of birth missing (living people)
Living people
Alumni of the University of East London
Ghanaian bankers
Ghanaian women writers
University of Ghana alumni
Alumni of Aburi Girls' Senior High School